The 1914 South Australian Football League season was the 38th season of the top-level Australian rules football competition in South Australia.

The season opened on 2 May with a match between South Adelaide and Port Adelaide, and concluded on 19 September with the Grand Final, in which minor premiers Port Adelaide went on to win its eighth premiership, defeating  by 79 points.

 and  also made the top four teams and participated in the finals series. West Adelaide, South Adelaide and  all missed the top four.

The 1914 South Australian Football League season is the only time in SAFA/SAFL/SANFL history a team has gone through the entire season winning every game. In addition to going undefeated during the SAFL season, Port Adelaide beat a composite team of all the other SAFL sides and the Carlton Football Club in the Champions of Australia match played at Adelaide Oval.

1914 SAFL Minor Rounds

Round 1

Round 2

Round 3

Round 4

Round 5

Round 6

Round 7

Round 8

Round 9

Round 10

Round 11

Round 12

Round 13

Round 14

Ladder

Win/Loss table 

Bold – Home game
X – Bye
Opponent for round listed above margin

1914 SAFL Finals

Week 1

Week 2

Week 3 (1914 SAFL Grand Final)

Awards 
 The Magarey Medal was awarded to Jack Ashley of Port Adelaide, who received the most votes.
 The Leading Goal Kicker was Jack Dunn of Port Adelaide, who kicked 33 goals during the home and away season.

Best and fairest

Club leadership

Post-season

1914 Championship of Australia

1914 SAFL Combined State Game

References 

SAFL
South Australian National Football League seasons